Syrian refugee camps in Jordan were built following the influx of 1.4 million Syrians, escaping the Syrian Civil War. There are 5 Syrian refugee camps in Jordan, 3 of which are official while the rest are temporary. However, only 650,000 Syrians are registered with the United Nations, and around 90% of Syrians do not live in these camps, but in Jordanian towns and cities.

These are:
Zaatari (opened July 2012)
Mrajeeb Al Fhood (opened April 2013)
Azraq (opened April 2014)
King Abdullah Park (KAP) (in Irbid Governorate, opened 2012; small camp housing Syrians and Palestinians)

Location of camps

UNCHR 2018 map of refugee camps and settlements in Jordan here does not show Hadallat.

Older map:

See also

Refugees of the Syrian Civil War in Jordan
Syrian refugee camps
Syrian diaspora
Syrians in Jordan

External links
Refugees Operational Portal: Syrian Regional Refugee Response: Jordan
E-International Relations: Conflict and Migration in the Middle East: Syrian Refugees in Jordan and Lebanon
Migrants, Asylum Seekers And Refugees In Jordan, 2017

References

Refugee camps in Jordan
Jordan
Middle East-related lists
Jordan-related lists
Jordan refugee camps